Nikko Sarai is a village in Dera Baba Nanak in Gurdaspur district of Punjab State, India. The village is administrated by Sarpanch s.nishan singh (2023)an elected representative of the village.

Demography 
, The village has a total number of 401 houses and the population of 1972 of which 1021 are males while 951 are females.  According to the report published by Census India in 2011, out of the total population of the village 771 people are from Schedule Caste and the village does not have any Schedule Tribe population so far.

See also
List of villages in India

References

External links 
 Tourism of Punjab
 Census of Punjab

Villages in Gurdaspur district
Caravanserais in India